Pseudohydromys is a genus of rodent in the family Muridae endemic to New Guinea.
It contains the following species:

 Bishop's moss mouse (Pseudohydromys berniceae) 
 Huon small-toothed moss mouse (Pseudohydromys carlae) 
 Laurie's moss mouse (Pseudohydromys eleanorae) 
 One-toothed shrew mouse (Pseudohydromys ellermani)
 Mottled-tailed shrew mouse (Pseudohydromys fuscus)
 German's one-toothed moss mouse (Pseudohydromys germani)
 Eastern shrew mouse (Pseudohydromys murinus)
 Musser's shrew mouse (Pseudohydromys musseri)
 Western shrew mouse (Pseudohydromys occidentalis)
 Woolley's moss mouse (Pseudohydromys patriciae) 
 Southern small-toothed moss mouse (Pseudohydromys pumehanae) 
 White-bellied moss mouse (Pseudohydromys sandrae) 
It was not until a 2009 revision that a general idea of the true taxonomic content of this genus was realized.

References

 
Rodent genera
Taxonomy articles created by Polbot
Endemic fauna of New Guinea